The Team results of 5 km open water swimming at the 8th FINA World Aquatics Championships are composed of total time from three swimmers per nation from the Men's single and Women's single 5K races where each gender must have at least one swimmer.

Results

References

World Aquatics Championships
Open water swimming at the 1998 World Aquatics Championships